There have been four baronetcies created for persons with the surname Stanley, all in the Baronetage of England. Two of the creations are extant as of 2010.

The Stanley Baronetcy, of Bickerstaffe in the County Palatine of Lancaster, was created in the Baronetage of England on 26 June 1627. For more information on this creation, see the Earl of Derby.

The Stanley Baronetcy, of Alderley Hall in the County of Chester, was created in the Baronetage of England on 25 June 1660. For more information on this creation, see the Baron Stanley of Alderley.

The Stanley, later Stanley-Massey-Stanley, later Errington Baronetcy, of Hooton in the County of Chester, was created in the Baronetage of England on 17 June 1661. For more information on this creation, see Errington baronets.

The Stanley Baronetcy, of Grange Gorman in the County of Dublin, was created in the Baronetage of England on 13 April 1699 for John Stanley, subsequently Chief Secretary for Ireland. The title became extinct on his death in 1744.

Stanley baronets, of Bickerstaffe (1627)
see Earl of Derby

Stanley baronets, of Alderley Hall (1660)
Sir Edward Stanley, 5th Baronet
Sir John Thomas Stanley FRSE, 6th Baronet (26 March 1735 – 29 November 1807) 
Sir John Thomas Stanley, 7th Baronet (raised to Baron)
see also Baron Stanley of Alderley

Stanley baronets, of Hooton (1661)
see Errington baronets

Stanley baronets, of Grange Gorman (1699)
Sir John Stanley, 1st Baronet (1663–1744)

Notes

References
Kidd, Charles, Williamson, David (editors). Debrett's Peerage and Baronetage (1990 edition). New York: St Martin's Press, 1990, 

Baronetcies in the Baronetage of England
Extinct baronetcies in the Baronetage of England
Stanley family
1627 establishments in England